Fragile Records is a sub-record label of Transmat from Detroit.

See also
 List of record labels

American record labels
Techno record labels
History of Detroit